Knoutsodonta pusilla is a species of sea slug, a dorid nudibranch, a shell-less marine gastropod mollusc in the family Onchidorididae.

Distribution
This species was described from Tor Bay, Devon, England. It is currently known from the European coasts of the North Atlantic Ocean from Norway, south to the Atlantic coast of Spain.

Diet
Knoutsodonta pusilla feeds on the bryozoans Escharella immersa, Microporella ciliata, Escharoides coccineus and Porella concinna.

References

Onchidorididae
Gastropods described in 1845